General elections were held in Tuvalu on 2 September 1993. As there were no political parties, all candidates for the twelve seats ran as independents. Prime Minister Bikenibeu Paeniu was re-elected, along with all members of his cabinet, except Naama Latasi.

Results

Aftermath
Following the elections, supporters of Paeniu held six seats, whilst supporter of the previous Prime Minister Tomasi Puapua held the other six.

The members of the opposition to Paeniu were Tomasi Puapua, Otinielu Tausi, Vavae Katalake, Koloa Talake, Vave Founuku and Faimalaga Luka.

In order to break the impasse, the Governor-General dissolved Parliament on 22 September and fresh elections were held in November.

References

Tuvalu
1993 09
1993 in Tuvalu
Non-partisan elections
Tuvalu
1993